Clova is an intelligent personal assistant for Android and iOS operating systems developed by Naver Corporation and Line Corporation (a subsidiary of Naver). Clova, short for "cloud virtual assistant", was officially introduced on 1 March 2017. It was first launched in the Apple App Store and Google Play Store as intelligent personal assistant app.

In August 2017, it was announced that the artificial intelligence platform would be used in their smart speaker series. The Wave speaker, released in Korea as Wave (sometimes referred to as Naver Wave) and in Japan as Line Wave for the Korean and Japanese markets), is the first smart speaker that uses Clova. The Friends speaker (or Clova Wave in Japan), a LINE Friends character themed speaker, was the second smart speaker powered by the platform.

In October 2020, Naver released 'Clova Lamp', an AI light that reads books. It works when you open a book under the camera on the lamp and press the book reading button or say 'Clova, read me a book.' This product can read books in English as well as Korean.

See also

 Google Assistant
 Celia (virtual assistant)
 Bixby

References

External links
 Official website (Japanese)
 Official website (Korean)

Virtual assistants
2017 software
IOS software
Android (operating system) software